The Rabaa Al-Adawiya Mosque, also transliterated Rabi'a Al-Adawiya, Rabaa El-Adawia or Rabaa El-Adaweya, is a mosque located on the northern edge of Nasr City district in eastern Cairo. It was named after the 8th-century Sufi saint Rabia Al-Adawiya.

A number of high-profile funerals have been conducted at the mosque, including that of Anwar Sadat and Ma'mun al-Hudaybi, partially due to its proximity to the cemetery east of Cairo.

In July 2013, Rabaa Al-Adawiya Mosque and the adjacent Rabaa Square became a sit-in protest area for supporters of President Mohamed Morsi after he was removed from power by Minister of Defense Abdel Fattah el-Sisi on July 3. The mosque was later destroyed on August 14, 2013, during what became known as the August 2013 Rabaa massacre, when security forces violently moved in and evacuated the area, resulting in at least 638 deaths. The mosque was later rebuilt under the direction of the Egyptian Armed Forces.

Association of the Rabia Al-Adawiya Mosque 
The Association of the Rabia Al-Adawiya Mosque established in 1993 is an association working in the field of philanthropy and development in Cairo. The Assembly Board of Directors consists of 11 members and works with a General Assembly of 300 volunteers, headed by Chancellor Syed Sobkey.

See also
  Lists of mosques 
  List of mosques in Africa
  List of mosques in Egypt
August 2013 Rabaa massacre
Rabia sign
List of mosques in Cairo

References

Mosques in Cairo